Sandoh Chiefdom is a chiefdom in Kono District of Sierra Leone. Its capital is Kayima.

References 

Chiefdoms of Sierra Leone
Eastern Province, Sierra Leone